Brian Campion (born December 11, 1970) is a Vermont educator, and politician. A member of the Democratic Party, he represents Bennington district in the Vermont Senate.

In addition to his work as a legislator, Campion is the Director of Public Policy Programs for the Center for the Advancement of Public Action (CAPA) at Bennington College where he facilitates all programs connected to state and federal policy. He has organized and led talk series on various public policy issues including contemporary challenges to American Democracy.

Campion ran for state representative in 2010, one of three candidates seeking two seats in the Bennington-2-1 district. Both incumbent state representatives, Democrat Tim Corcoran II and Republican Joseph L. Krawczyk, Jr., were seeking re-election and had endorsed each other. In the general election held on November 2, 2010, Campion won 1,461 votes, finishing behind Corcoran's 1,965 but ahead of Krawczyk's 1,120. He was therefore elected and took office on January 5, 2011. He won re-election in 2012. Campion was elected to the Vermont Senate in 2014.

Campion is the Chair of the Senate Committee on Education and is a member of the Senate Committee on Natural Resources and Energy.

References

External links
Campaign website

1970 births
Living people
People from Bennington, Vermont
Gay politicians
Democratic Party members of the Vermont House of Representatives
LGBT state legislators in Vermont
Politicians from Albany, New York
Springfield College (Massachusetts) alumni
Université Laval alumni
University of Massachusetts Amherst alumni
University of Provence alumni
21st-century American politicians
21st-century American LGBT people